Aplogompha is a genus of moths in the family Geometridae.

Species
Aplogompha angusta Dyar, 1914
Aplogompha argentilinea Schaus, 1911
Aplogompha aurifera Thierry-Mieg, 1904
Aplogompha chotaria Schaus, 1898
Aplogompha costimaculata (Warren, 1900)
Aplogompha frena Dognin, 1899
Aplogompha joevinaria (Schaus, 1923)
Aplogompha laeta Warren, 1905
Aplogompha lafayi (Dognin, 1889)
Aplogompha noctilaria (Schaus, 1901)
Aplogompha opulenta (Thierry-Mieg, 1892)
Aplogompha riofrio (Dognin, 1889)
Aplogompha saumayaria (Schaus, 1923)
Aplogompha yerna Dognin, 1899

References

Ennominae
Geometridae genera